Mickaël Ravaux (born January 2, 1979 in Belfort) is a French professional football player, who currently plays for Vesoul Haute-Saône.

Career
He played on the professional level in Ligue 1 for FC Sochaux-Montbéliard and in Ligue 2 for FC Sochaux-Montbéliard, Le Mans Union Club 72 and Grenoble Foot 38.

Notes 

1979 births
Living people
French footballers
Ligue 1 players
Ligue 2 players
FC Sochaux-Montbéliard players
Le Mans FC players
Grenoble Foot 38 players
AS Cannes players
Louhans-Cuiseaux FC players
SO Romorantin players
FC Vesoul players
Bergerac Périgord FC players
Sportspeople from Belfort
Association football defenders
Footballers from Bourgogne-Franche-Comté